The 2022 Copa del Rey de Baloncesto was the 86th edition of the Spanish Basketball King's Cup. It was managed by the ACB and was held in Granada, in the Palacio de Deportes in February 2022.

Barça defended successfully the title and conquered its second consecutive cup, 27th overall.

All times were in Central European Time (UTC+01:00).

Qualified teams 
The top eight ranking teams after the first half of the 2021–22 ACB regular season participated in the cup.

On December 27, 2021, the ACB clubs agreed unanimously to extend the scheduled date for the end of the first half of the regular season and qualification for the Copa del Rey no later than January 30, thus facilitating the recovery of postponed matches and competitive equality between all clubs. Since all the scheduled matches have not been played as of January 30, the win percentage as of January 30 was taken as the main criterion for qualifying for the Copa del Rey, counting only the matches corresponding to the first half of the regular season.

Venue 
On November 11, 2021, ACB selected and announced Granada to host the Copa del Rey in February 2022. The arena, which was opened in 1991, is primarily used for basketball and is the home arena of Fundación CB Granada, since 2015. The arena hosted the 1999 UEFA Futsal Championship and the matches of the Group A in EuroBasket 2007. In 2014, the arena also hosted the matches of the group of Spanish national team in the 2014 FIBA Basketball World Cup.

Draw 
The draw was held on 31 January 2021 in Granada, Spain. The top four ranking teams act as seeded teams in the draw of the quarterfinals. For its part, the top ranking team played its quarterfinal match on Thursday.

Bracket

Quarterfinals

Joventut vs. Lenovo Tenerife

Real Madrid vs. Río Breogán

Valencia Basket vs. UCAM Murcia

Barça vs. Baxi Manresa

Semifinals

Real Madrid vs. Lenovo Tenerife

Barça vs. UCAM Murcia

Final

References

External links 
 Official website 

Copa del Rey de Baloncesto
2021–22 in Spanish basketball
February 2022 sports events in Spain
2022 in Spanish sport